Mustafa Malayekah (born 21 May 1986) is a Saudi Arabian football player who currently plays as a goalkeeper for Al-Fateh and the Saudi Arabia national team.

He made his debut with Al-Ansar in the Saudi Premier League in 2004 and then transferred to Al-Ittihad in 2006. In 2012, he joined Hajer  where he spent five seasons before joining Al-Faisaly in 2016.

He was first called up to the Saudi Arabia national team in January 2006 where he was an unused substitute in the friendly against Sweden. He was then called up for the preliminary squad in preparation for the 2006 FIFA World Cup. However, Malayekah failed to make the final squad. 12 years later, Malayekah finally made his debut for the national team in the friendly against Brazil when he came off the bench in the 83rd minute.

Career
Malayekah started his career at his hometown club Al-Ansar and made his debut for the first team in 2004. On 24 February 2006, it was announced that Malayekah had signed a contract with Al-Ittihad for a reported fee of SAR4.5 million. He would join Al-Ittihad at the beginning of the 2006–07 season. On 9 February 2007, Malayekah started the Prince Faisal bin Fahd Cup final against derby rivals Al-Ahli which Al-Ittihad went on to lose 3–0. He was sent off in the 62nd minute. On 10 May 2007, Malayekah made his league debut for Al-Ittihad in the match against Al-Faisaly. On 29 December 2011, Malayekah joined Hajer on a six-month contract. He made his debut on 31 December, in the league match against Al-Hilal. On 21 April 2012, Malayekah renewed his contract with Hajer for another two seasons. On 4 April 2014, Malayekah achieved promotion to the Pro League with Hajer just one season after being relegated. He renewed his contract with Hajer for another year. On 8 May 2015, Malayekah once again renewed his contract with Hajer for another year.

Following Hajer's relegation to the First Division, Malayekah joined Al-Faisaly on a free transfer. He signed a three-year contract with the club. In his first season, Malayekah made 21 appearances in all competitions as Al-Faisaly finished 9th. In his second season, Malayekah started all 26 league games for Al-Faisaly as they finished 6th. He also made four appearances in the King Cup including the final, which they went on to lose. On 19 January 2019, Malayekah renewed his contract with Al-Faisaly for another three years. On 15 February 2020, Malayekah scored a stoppage time equalizer against Al-Fateh when he headed in Youssef El Jebli's corner kick. He made 28 appearances in the league as Al-Faisaly finished 5th, their highest ever finish in the top flight.

On 11 July 2022, Malayekah joined Al-Fateh on a free transfer following Al-Faisaly's relegation.

Career statistics

Club

Honours

Club
Al-Ittihad
Saudi Premier League/Saudi Pro League: 2006–07, 2008–09
King Cup: 2010

Hajer
Saudi First Division: 2013–14

Al-Faisaly
King Cup: 2020–21

Individual
 Saudi Professional League Goalkeeper of the Month: February 2022

References

1986 births
Living people
Saudi Arabian footballers
Saudi Arabia international footballers
Saudi Arabia youth international footballers
Al-Ansar FC (Medina) players
Ittihad FC players
Hajer FC players
Al-Faisaly FC players
Al-Fateh SC players
Saudi First Division League players
Saudi Professional League players
People from Medina
Association football goalkeepers
Saudi Arabian Shia Muslims